The Mittelschüler-Kartell-Verband der katholischen farbentragenden Studentenkorporationen Österreichs or simply Mittelschüler-Kartellverband (MKV) is an Austrian umbrella organisation of Catholic male student fraternities (Studentenverbindung). It was founded in 1933 on 9 September.

In contrast to umbrella organisations like, for example the "Cartellverband der katholischen deutschen Studentenverbindungen", the fraternities of the MKV do not consist of students from universities but of students from the upper levels of Austrian grammar schools.

Every Member of a fraternity in the MKV wears a ribbon as well as a specific cap, whose shape may vary according to the corporation, either coloured in the fraternity's colours. Most commonly every corporation uses three specific colours.

Currently more than 20.000 students or former students are members of more than 160 fraternities in the MKV.

As the MKV was founded upon the federalistic principle, these fraternities are organised in 9 provincial sub organisations according to the official Austrian federal provinces.

Principles

Every fraternity of the MKV has to be founded upon four principles:

 religio: the fraternity and all its members publicly adhere to the Roman Catholic faith;
 scientia: the pursuit of an academic education is common to all of its members;
 amicitia: a lifelong friendship between all the members of the fraternity as long as they live;
 patria: patriotism towards Austria within a European context.

The fraternities of the Cartellverband historically do not practise academic fencing (Mensur) because it was forbidden by the Roman Catholic Church. The fraternities only accept men into the organisation.

Relations

The MKV itself is member of the Europäischer Kartellverband (EKV), a European umbrella organisation. The MKV has friendly relations with other umbrella organisations that are members of the Europäischer Kartellverband (EKV), especially with the Cartellverband der katholisch österreichischen Studentenverbindungen (ÖCV).

See also
 Burschenschaft
 Corps
 Landsmannschaft
 Turnerschaft
 Corporation (university)
 Cartellverband der katholischen deutschen Studentenverbindungen

Literature
 Heinrich Obermüller: Verboten und Verfolgt; Catholic Fraternities at Austrian Grammar Schools, From the beginnings until 1918; First Volume of  "Tradition und Zukunft“ ; Österr. Verein f. Studentengeschichte; Vienna 1991; 640 Pages.
 Heinrich Obermüller: Aufbruch und Untergang; Catholic Fraternities in German-speaking regions, From 1918 until 1945; Volume 5 & 8 of "Tradition und Zukunft“; Österr. Verein f. Studentengeschichte; Vienna 2000 and 2003; 1.695 Pages.
 Wilhelm Schmied: Der Mittelschüler-Kartell-Verband (MKV); Contributions to the Austrian history of Student corporations – Volume 1; Österr. Verein f. Studentengeschichte; Vienna 1973, 103 Pages.
 Nicht alles was gleich aussieht ist auch gleich; Student corporations from the beginnings until today; Wiener Stadtverband des MKV; Vienna 2003, 42 Pages.

External links
Mittelschüler-Kartell-Verband der katholischen farbentragenden Studentenkorporationen Österreichs 
Cartellverband der katholischen österreichischen Studentenverbindungen

Christian fraternities and sororities in Austria
Student organizations established in 1933
1933 establishments in Austria